Stephanus Cornelius "Fanie" Louw  (16 September 1909 – 13 July 1940) was a South African rugby union player.

Playing career
Louw was born in Paarl, received his schooling at Paarl Boys' High and in 1927 he started playing rugby at the Paarl RC.

Louw made his debut for the Springboks in 1933 against the touring Australian team. In 1937 he toured with the Springboks to Australia and New Zealand and in 1938 he played in all three test matches against the touring team from the British Isles. He also played 18 tour matches and scored six tries for the Springboks.

Louw died on 13 July 1940 at Ellis Park, at the age of thirty, shortly after he captained Transvaal to a victory over the Western Province. He died of a heart attack caused by him being born with a malformed aorta.

Test history

See also
List of South Africa national rugby union players – Springbok no. 222

References

1909 births
1940 deaths
South African rugby union players
South Africa international rugby union players
Western Province (rugby union) players
Golden Lions players
Sportspeople from Paarl
Rugby union players from the Western Cape
Rugby union props